Vespasiano is an Italian masculine given name which may refer to:

 Vespasiano Anfiareo (1490–1564), Italian writer and calligrapher
 Vespasiano Bignami (1841–1929), Italian painter, art critic and caricaturist
 Vespasiano da Bisticci (1421–1498), Florentine humanist and librarian
 Vespasiano Colonna (c. 1485–1528), Italian nobleman and condottiero (mercenary leader)
 Vespasiano Genuino (1552–1637), Italian sculptor
 Vespasiano I Gonzaga (1531–1591), condottiero and founder of Sabbioneta, Lombardy
 Vespasiano Vincenzo Gonzaga (1621–1687), Italian noble and Viceroy of Valencia
 Vespasiano Strada (1582–1622), Italian painter and engraver

See also
 Vespasian (name)

Italian masculine given names